Nonene is an alkene with the molecular formula C9H18. Many structural isomers are possible, depending on the location of the C=C double bond and the branching of the other parts of the molecule. Industrially, the most important nonenes are trimers of propene: Tripropylene. This mixture of branched nonenes is used in the alkylation of phenol to produce nonylphenol, a precursor to detergents, which are also controversial pollutants.

Linear nonenes

References

Alkenes
D